Saad Al-Yami is a Saudi Arabian football who plays as a midfielder .

External links

1986 births
Living people
Saudi Arabian footballers
Ettifaq FC players
Al-Nahda Club (Saudi Arabia) players
Najran SC players
Hajer FC players
Al-Taawoun FC players
Al-Faisaly FC players
Al-Raed FC players
Al-Ansar FC (Medina) players
Al-Jubail Club players
Saudi First Division League players
Saudi Professional League players
Saudi Second Division players
Association football midfielders